Utian (also Miwok–Costanoan, previously Mutsun) is a family of indigenous languages spoken in Northern California, United States. The Miwok and Ohlone peoples both spoke languages of the Utian language family. It has recently been argued that the Utian languages and Yokuts languages are sub-families of the Yok-Utian language family (Callaghan 1997, 2001; Golla 2007:76-77). Utian and Yokutsan have traditionally been considered part of the Penutian language phylum (Goddard 1996:313-319; Mithun 1999; Shipley 1978:82-85).

All Utian languages are severely endangered.

See also

 Penutian languages
 Miwok languages
 Ohlone languages

References

 Callaghan, Catherine. (1997). Evidence for Yok-Utian. International Journal of American Linguistics, 63, pages 18–64.
 Callaghan, Catherine. (2001). More evidence for Yok-Utian: A reanalysis of the Dixon and Kroeber sets International Journal of American Linguistics, 67 (3), pages 313-346.
 Callaghan, Catherine. (2014). Proto-Utian Grammar and Dictionary: with notes on Yokuts. Trends in Linguistics Documentation 31. Berlin: De Gruyter Mouton. 
 Goddard, Ives. (1996). "The Classification of the Native Languages of North America." In Languages, Ives Goddard, ed., pp. 290–324. Handbook of North American Indians Vol. 17, W. C. Sturtevant, general ed. Washington, D. C.: Smithsonian Institution. .
 Golla, Victor. (2007). "Linguistic Prehistory" in California Prehistory: Colonization, Culture, and Complexity, pp. 71–82. Terry L. Jones and Kathryn A. Klar, editors. New York: Altamira Press. .
 Mithun, Marianne. (1999). The languages of Native North America. Cambridge: Cambridge University Press.  (hbk); .
 Shipley, William F. (1978). Native Languages of California, in Handbook of North American Indians, Vol. 8 (California). William C. Sturtevant, and Robert F. Heizer, eds. Washington, DC: Smithsonian Institution.  / 0160045754, pages 80–90.

External links

Native Tribes, Groups, Language Families and Dialects of California in 1770  (map after Kroeber)
Online books about the Southern Sierra Miwok
Central Sierra Miwok Dictionary
Central Sierra Language Preservation Program, Tuolumne Band of Me-Wuk Indians
Southern Sierra Miwok Dictionary

 
Language families
Indigenous languages of California
Yok-Utian languages

fr:Langues miwok